Jonathan Shaw may refer to:

Jonathan Shaw (British Army officer) (born 1957)
Jonathan Shaw (cricketer) (born 1980), English cricketer
Jonathan Shaw (photographer), British photographer and educator
Jonathan Shaw (politician) (born 1966), British Labour Party politician
Jonathan Shaw (tattoo artist) (born 1953), American tattoo artist

See also
John Shaw (disambiguation)